ʿUthmān ibn Ḥunayf (Arabic: عثمان بن حنيف) was one of the companions of Muhammad (Sm). According to Shia belief, he did not give allegiance to Abu Bakr, until Ali supposedly did so. He narrated the Hadith of the blind man.

Qadi Yusuf says that Uthman ibn Hunayf was an authority in all Arabia on taxation, assessment of land revenue and land reclamation. He was employed by Umar as a land revenue expert.

He was appointed governor of Basra by Ali.

References

Sahabah who participated in the battle of Uhud